The Serpollet Tricycle/Peugeot Type 1 is a small steam tricycle, produced by Peugeot in 1886.  It is the first Peugeot car ever made.

The Serpollet Tricycle was one of the first industrially manufactured motor vehicles; it was designed by Léon Serpollet, and first presented in 1886. The tricycle possessed an oil-fired boiler and a single-cylinder engine with poppet valves and crank cases.

References

First car made by manufacturer
1890s cars
Type 1
Cars introduced in 1886

Vehicles introduced in 1886